Ikenberry is the surname of American political scientist John Ikenberry.

Ikenberry may also refer to:

Judy Shapiro-Ikenberry (born 1942), American long-distance runner
 Marlin Ikenberry (born 1973), American college basketball coach
 Stanley O. Ikenberry (born 1935), 14th president of the University of Illinois
 Ikenberry Commons, a group of residence buildings at the University of Illinois
 Ikenberry Hall, a building that is part of the Manchester College Historic District